Moravany is a municipality and village in Brno-Country District in the South Moravian Region of the Czech Republic. It has about 3,400 inhabitants.

History
The first written mention of Moravany is from 1289.

References

Villages in Brno-Country District